Wiremu Maihi Te Rangikaheke (?–1896) was a notable New Zealand tribal leader, scholar and public servant. Of Māori descent, he identified with the Ngati Rangiwewehi iwi. He was born in Puhirua or Te Awahou in New Zealand.

References

1896 deaths
New Zealand public servants
New Zealand Māori public servants
Ngāti Rangiwewehi people
Year of birth missing